Rugby union in Egypt is a minor but growing sport.

Governing body
The governing body is the Egyptian Rugby Football Union, which was founded in 2008. It is a member of the Confederation of African Rugby (CAR).

History

Rugby was first introduced into Egypt by the British, and was generally played by expatriates. However, the departure of the British from the region meant that the game went into sharp decline. Like many other North African nations, Egyptian rugby tended to look to Europe for inspiration, rather than to the rest of Africa or the Middle East. However, the Dubai Sevens has helped stir up some interest in the sport in Arabic-speaking nations. Rugby union is quite popular in neighbouring Israel, but the hostility between the two nations means that there is little sporting contact between them.

During the lead up to the Dardanelles Campaign, and Gallipoli in World War I, a number of ANZAC and British troops were stationed in Egypt. They played a number of games "in the shadow of the pyramids", and these were "games that meant as much to the players and the keen followers as ever did an international game on the Sydney Cricket Ground". The pitches were described as consisting of "sun-baked mud that rashed and cut all unwary players, or several inches deep in heavy, black mud". Tom Richards would write:

"Playing on the Delta country, with the mighty monument of Cheops towering to a height of nearly 560 feet [170m] above our playing level, stirred everyone with a feeling of awe. It was certainly a venerable spot to play on... There was an atmosphere so full of Eastern mesmerism - the mystic veil of the East - that all young Australians conjured up wild imaginations of and played their manly game with the same vigour and dash as if they were in an amphitheatre, where any lack of determination meant 'thumbs down' which, in turn, meant death to the losers."

However, there has been an upsurge of rugby in the Middle East - particularly the Persian Gulf, and in Africa, and this has stimulated interest in the game there. In addition, the Egyptian diaspora in English and French speaking countries has become interested in the game.

Cairo RFC was founded in the 1980s, at a social club and it was the only club in Egypt for a number of years. Alexandria RFC was founded in 2003, by expatriates. The first match was played in 1981. Cairo Rugby Club, led by Mickey Wheeler MTB, played against a team made up of expats from a construction Co. (Higgs and Hill) led by Bernie Adams. The first half was played by the designated teams and in the second half, many substitutes were allowed on the H and H team with anybody who brought boots to the match. The game was advertised on the local media and on the match day at the American school, the Mayor Cairo attended with 4000 spectators. It was a great day, a great match and a great beginning.

There are currently twelve Egyptian rugby clubs: the Alexandria Rugby Club, Alexandria Warriors R.F.C, AUC Wolves American University in Cairo, GUC Panthers German University in Cairo, Cairo Rugby Club, British University in Cairo (BUE), Sharm Sharks R.F.C ., The Old Alssonians, Raptors in the Faculty of Engineering, Alexandria Uni, AAST Titans in the Arab Academy for Science and Technology, Alexandria, Eagles in the Alex Aero Club and the Malaysian Alex Rugby Club.

The game is currently in a state of intense development, with an Egyptian rugby Championship established, and attempts to set up a national team.

Under 20s rugby

Egypt has seen some progress in under-twenties rugby.

The first Egypt U-20s team recently toured Lebanon, playing two test matches and winning them both (52-5 and 14-10). Managed by Shady A. Abo Shady, founder of juniors and girls rugby, and coached by Ahmed El-Soussi, the squad was made up of players from several teams in Cairo and Alexandria.

See also
 Arthur Turner (cricketer), played for Blackheath F.C. in rugby and the Egypt national cricket team.

External links
 Egyptian Rugby Football Union
 Alexandria Rugby Club
 Cairo Rugby Club
 CAR
 "Islam and Rugby" on the Rugby Readers review

References